Martina Hingis and Anna Kournikova were the defending champions, but withdrew before their semifinal match against Justine Henin and Meghann Shaughnessy.

Lindsay Davenport and Lisa Raymond won the title, defeating Henin and Shaughnessy in the final 6–4, 6–7(4–7), 7–5.

Seeds

Draw

Draw

External links
Draw information

Porsche Tennis Grand Prix Doubles
2000 Women's Doubles